Bear Creek High School is a high school located in north Stockton, California. It is part of Lodi Unified School District (LUSD). Current enrollment is roughly 2,000 students. Before Ronald E. McNair High School opened in 2006, Bear Creek was the newest high school in LUSD.

History
Bear Creek High School first opened for the 1991-92 school year. It was the first high school from LUSD to be built in Stockton, about 10 miles from the closest LUSD high school (Tokay High School).

Serving from 1991 to 1997, Bob Vieth was the school's inaugural principal. Under his watch, Bear Creek expanded enrollment from 1,100 students to 2,100 and added an integrated math and science curricula. However, the school faced complaints from parents about poor academic performance by students of color.

Controversies
The Record reported in January 2005 that some black students had been arrested for assaulting white students, in incidents near the school gym and in the boys' restroom- which produced some discontent among parents, although there was no evidence the attacks were racially motivated. The report also described gang activity, gambling, and drugs as common on campus.

In the 2010–11 school year, then-principal Daryl Camp caused controversy by requesting review and restriction of school newspaper The Bruin Voice before it was published monthly, a violation of California Education Code 48907. Despite the Voice having no previous reprimands from administration and winning statewide awards, Camp stated that he wanted to make sure the school is free of libel. Camp was replaced by Jesse M. Bethel High School principal Shirley McNichols after the school year.

Native American totem cut down. Around 2005-6 land built on native burial ground.

Only around 10% of students attended classes on September 19, 2014, after principal Bill Atterberry emailed parents alerting of a possible terrorist threat. Atterberry wrote in his September 18 email: "This afternoon, we received a call from an upset parent who said that he was 'coming down tomorrow and it’s going to be like a Columbine situation.'" The parent, Orlando Johnson, clarified that he wanted to know why his 14-year-old son had missed 30 days of school and told The Record that his exact question to school staff was: "Would you want the school to be like a Columbine, I get a phone call that my kid is dead?"

In November 2017, a widely circulated cell phone video showed a Bear Creek biology teacher asking a student to leave class for being disruptive, attempting to take the student by the arm, and finally dragging the student by his backpack out of the classroom. The student's father began to seek legal recourse.
 
In May 2019, a video showed a brawl between students and police; amidst the brawl, a trash can was seen thrown at the police. The police officer was trying to arrest a student.

Bear Creek in the News

Notable alumni
 Neck Face, (class of 2002), graffiti artist
 Shani Hilton (class of 2002), journalist and current head of US news at BuzzFeed
 Chase Hudson, social media personality
 Ryan Leslie (class of 1994), R&B singer
 Jasmine Sandlas (class of 2006), Punjabi singer

Athletics
Bear Creek High School was well known for their National Champion Cheerleading squads from 1997 - 2001. They were coached by John Hebert, Lisa Deeter (Science teacher) and Gigi Mandujan.

In the early years of Bear Creek, the men's track and field teams were strong. They were coached by Greg Wright  (History teacher) who now coaches at Lodi High School in Lodi, California. In 1994 and 1995, the Bruins battled Sonora High School for the top spot in the Valley Oak League, winning the school's first league championship in 1995. Bear Creek won the San Joaquin Athletic Association track and field league championship over Stagg High School in 1997. They had a 7'1" high jumper Darryl Feilbach and a 16'7" pole vaulter David Gritz. Feilbach tied the 1st place jump at the California State meet and Gritz took 1st alone, just missing on the CIF state meet record of 17'1". There were also some stand outs in the 98 and 99 season, but not to the extent of Feilbach and Gritz. Feilbach and Gritz both went on to compete in the national championships in 1997.

In 2007, the girls varsity track team ranked 2nd in the state for their 400 x 400; in the 2007-2008 be the boys Cross-Country team took second place in league.

The swimming and water polo teams practiced each day at McNair High School, however in May 2007, groundbreaking began for several new additions to the school, including a new pool. Additionally a second gym and a theater arts center, which were opened for partial use in fall 2008.

Men's Varsity Tennis also achieved being #1 in their league in both 05-06 and 06-07 seasons.

Other sports offered at Bear Creek include baseball, water polo, football, badminton, cross country, track and field, basketball, tennis, golf, girls volleyball, soccer, wrestling, and girls softball.

In recent years, the Freshman football team has consistently failed to make grades by the end of first quarter, causing them to cancel the rest of the season.

Administrator of the Year 
Dennis To (2013 - Present)

References

External links
 Bear Creek High School official website
 School statistics by the National Center for Education Statistics
 The Bruin Voice, the on-campus student newspaper

High schools in San Joaquin County, California
Education in Stockton, California
Public high schools in California
1991 establishments in California
Educational institutions established in 1991